NPO may refer to:

Medicine
 Nil per os, Latin for "nothing by mouth", a medical instruction to withhold oral intake of food and fluids
 neurogenic pulmonary oedema

Science
 North Pacific Oscillation, a teleconnection pattern in atmospheric conditions over the North Pacific
 NP optimization problem, an optimization problem that is NP-hard

Organisations
 Nonprofit organization
 National Portfolio Organisation, a UK-based culture and arts organisation receiving substantial funding from Arts Council England
 National Ports Organisation, former part of the UK Department for Transport
 National Preservation Office, part of the British Library
 Scientific Production Association (Nauchno-Proizvodstvennoye Obyedineniye), a form of scientific research-to-production facility in the Soviet Union and the Russian Federation.
 Nederlandse Publieke Omroep (organization) ("Netherlands Public Broadcasting"), governing body of the Netherlands (Dutch) Public Broadcasting System
 Nederlands Publieke Omroepbestel ("Dutch public broadcasting system"), the public broadcasting service in the Netherlands
 Netherlands Pathfinder Organisation (Nederlandse Padvinders Organisatie), one of the organisations that evolved into Scouting Nederland, the national Scouting organisation
 NPO UK Ltd., a chain of stationery and book shops in Northern Ireland, now part of Eason & Son

Other
 Nanga Pinoh Airport, by IATA code
 Pochuri language, by ISO 639 code